FASER (ForwArd Search ExpeRiment) is one of the nine particle physics experiments in 2022 at the Large Hadron Collider at CERN. It is designed to both search for new light and weakly coupled elementary particles, and to detect and study the interactions of high-energy collider neutrinos. In March 2023, FASER reported the first observation of collider neutrinos.  

The experiment is installed in the service tunnel TI12, which is 480 m downstream from the interaction point used by the ATLAS experiment. This tunnel was formerly used to inject the beam from the SPS into the LEP accelerator. In this location, the FASER experiment is placed into an intense and highly collimated beam of both neutrinos as well as possible new particles. Additionally, it is shielded from ATLAS by about 100 meters of rock and concrete, providing a low background environment. The FASER experiment was approved in 2019. In the following year, the detector was build and installed in 2021. The experiment started taking data at the beginning of Run 3 of the LHC in summer 2022.

New physics searches 
The primary goal of the FASER experiment is to search for new light and weakly interacting particles, that have not been discovered yet, such as dark photons, axion-like particles and sterile neutrinos. If these particles are sufficiently light, they can be produced in rare decays of hadrons. Such particles will therefore be dominantly produced in the forward direction along the collision axis, forming a highly collimated beam, and can inherit a large fraction of the LHC proton beam energy. Additionally, due to their small couplings to the standard model particles and large boosts, these particles are long-lived and can easily travel hundreds of meters without interacting before they decay to standard model particles. These decays lead to a spectacular signal, the appearance of highly energetic particles, which FASER aims to detect.

In March 2023, the FASER collaboration reported their first results on the search for dark photons. No signal consistent with a dark photon was seen in their 2022 data and limits on previously unconstrained parameter space were set.

Neutrino physics 
The LHC is the highest energy particle collider built so far, and therefore also the source of the most energetic neutrinos created in a controlled laboratory environment. Indeed, collisions at the LHC lead to a large flux of high-energy neutrinos of all flavours, which are highly collimated around the beam collision axis and stream through the FASER location. 

In 2021, the FASER Collaboration announced the first detection of collider neutrino candidates. The data used for this discovery was collected by a small emulsion pilot detector with a target mass of 11 kg. The detector was placed in the service tunnel TI18, and the data was collected for only four weeks during LHC Run 2 in 2018. While this outcome falls short of being a discovery of collider neutrinos, it highlights the potential and feasibility of conducting dedicated neutrino experiments at the LHC.

In March 2023, the FASER collaboration reported the first observation of collider neutrinos. For this, they searched for events in which a high momentum track emerges from the central part of the FASERv detector volume and no activity in the most upstream veto layers, as expected from a muon neutrino interaction. This search was performed one using only the electronic detector components. 

To study these neutrino interactions in greater detail, FASER also contains the dedicated FASERv sub-detector (which is pronounced FASERnu).  During it's nominal run time of a few years, about 10000 neutrinos are expected to be recorded by FASERν. These neutrinos typically have TeV scale energies, allowing FASERv to study their interactions in a regime where they are currently unconstrained.

FASERnu will be capable of exploring the following physics domains:

 FASERv will measure neutrino-nucleus interaction cross sections for all three neutrino flavours at the TeV energy scale. With the ability to identify the neutrino flavor, it will allow to test lepton flavour universality in neutrino scattering. 
 FASERv will be able to see the highest number of tau neutrino interactions, allowing to study this elusive particle in greater detail. 
 FASERv will carry out very precise measurements of muon neutrino interactions at an energy scale never explored before. These measurements will allow to probe the proton's structure and constrain parton distribution functions. 
 Neutrinos at FASERv are primarily produced in the decay of pions, kaons and charmed hadrons. The measurement of the neutrino fluxes therefore allows to constrain the production of these particles in kinematic regime that is inaccessible for the other LHC experiments. This will provide new key inputs for astro-particle physics experiments.

Detector 

Located at the front end of FASER is the FASERν neutrino detector. It consists of many layers of emulsion films interleaved with tungsten plates as target material for neutrino interactions. Behind FASERν and at the entrance to the main detector is a charged particle veto consisting of plastic scintillators.  This is followed by a 1.5 meter long empty decay volume and a 2 meter long spectrometer, which are placed in a 0.55 T magnetic field. The spectrometer consists of three tracking stations, composed of layers of precision silicon strip detectors, to detect charged particles produced in the decay of long-lived particles. Located at the end is an electromagnetic calorimeter.

References

External links 

 Official FASER website
FASER experiment record on INSPIRE-HEP

CERN experiments
Particle experiments
Large Hadron Collider